Nyunzu is a territory in the Tanganyika Province of the Democratic Republic of the Congo.

Territories of Tanganyika Province